Paris is an American police procedural that aired on the CBS television network from September 29, 1979 to January 15, 1980. The show is notable as the first appearance of actor James Earl Jones in a television lead role. Paris was created and executive produced by Steven Bochco, and produced by Edward DeBlasio for MTM Enterprises.

Plot
Los Angeles Police Captain Woody Paris (Jones) is the supervisor of a team of rookie detectives, led by Sergeant Stacy Erickson (Cecilia Hart) and including officers Charlie Bogart (Jake Mitchell), Ernesto Villas (Frank Ramirez), and Willie Miller (Michael Warren). Hank Garrett portrayed Deputy Chief Jerome Bench, Paris' superior, and, in an unusual turn for police dramas of that era, Paris' home and off-duty life was given considerable attention, with Lee Chamberlin portraying his wife Barbara. Paris additionally moonlighted as a professor of criminology at a local university.

Reception
Although Paris was critically acclaimed for its portrayal of the tension between the title character and his often impetuous underlings, it failed to attract viewers due to CBS scheduling it in one of the worst timeslots on a weekly schedule: Saturdays at 10 p.m. CBS moved the show to Tuesdays in the same timeslot in a futile attempt to improve ratings, and the show was canceled in 1980 after one season of thirteen episodes, two of which were not broadcast.

Jones married former costar Hart two years after Paris cancellation, and they remained together until her death in 2016.

Cast
James Earl Jones as Detective Capt. Woodrow "Woody" Paris 
Hank Garrett as Deputy Chief Jerome Bench 
Cecilia Hart as Sgt. Stacey Erickson 
Jake Mitchell as Det. Charlie Bogart 
Frank Ramírez as Det. Ernie Villas 
Michael Warren as Det. Willie Miller 
Lee Chamberlin as Barbara Paris

Episodes

Sources
Total Television: A Comprehensive Guide to Programming from 1948 to the Present, Alex McNeil, New York: Penguin, revised ed., 1984.

References

External links

1979 American television series debuts
1980 American television series endings
1970s American crime drama television series
1980s American crime drama television series
1970s American police procedural television series
1980s American police procedural television series
CBS original programming
English-language television shows
Fictional portrayals of the Los Angeles Police Department
Television shows set in Los Angeles
Television series by MTM Enterprises
Television series created by Steven Bochco
American detective television series